Aynsley Alan William Pears (born 23 April 1998) is an English professional footballer who plays as a goalkeeper for  club Blackburn Rovers.

Early life
Pears is the son of former Middlesbrough goalkeeper Stephen Pears.

Club career

Middlesbrough
On 17 January 2018, Pears was loaned out to Darlington, first for one month, then again for the remainder of the season. He would make a total of 16 appearances for the National League North side, keeping 5 clean sheets in his first 9 games.

On 27 July 2018, Pears joined Gateshead on a season-long loan. He would go on to make a total of 45 appearances, keeping 12 clean sheets and netting the club's Player's Player of the Year award at the season's close.

Following this previous campaign, Pears made his debut for parent club Middlesbrough in a 2–2 draw with Crewe Alexandra in the EFL Cup, which Crewe won 4–2 on penalties. In total, Pears made 25 competitive appearances for Middlesbrough before departing for fellow Championship side Blackburn Rovers.

Blackburn Rovers
On 16 October 2020, Pears joined EFL Championship club Blackburn Rovers for an undisclosed fee, signing a four-year-deal with the Lancashire outfit. It saw Pears end his 13-year association with Middlesbrough, although the move saw Pears link-up with former Boro manager Tony Mowbray and academy teammate Harry Chapman once again.

On 27 October, Pears made his debut for his new side, a game which saw Blackburn record a 4–2 defeat against Championship league leaders Reading.

International career
On 24 August 2016, Pears was called up alongside academy teammate Hayden Coulson by the England under-19s national team for their international friendly fixtures against the Netherlands and Belgium.

Pears made his England U19s debut on 1 September in a 1–1 draw against the Netherlands, coming on as a substitute for Will Mannion in the 46th minute. His final appearance for the U19s national team came on 10 October in England's 2–1 win against Bulgaria.

On 21 March 2018, Pears was called up by the under-20s for their games against Poland and Portugal after Leeds United youngster Will Huffer was forced to withdraw at the last minute due to an injury. It would be the last time Pears was called up for the England youth setup.

Career statistics

References

External links

1998 births
Living people
Sportspeople from Durham, England
Footballers from County Durham
English footballers
England youth international footballers
Association football goalkeepers
Middlesbrough F.C. players
Darlington F.C. players
Gateshead F.C. players
English Football League players
Blackburn Rovers F.C. players